Callogobius is a genus of fish in the family Gobiidae found in brackish and marine waters of the Indian and Pacific Ocean.

These small gobies are distinguished by ridges of papillae on their heads.

Species
The circumscription of the genus is unclear, but there are probably over 40 species in the genus as it is currently known. Species include:

 Callogobius albipunctatus Akihito & Ikeda, 2021
 Callogobius amikami Goren, Miroz & Baranes, 1991
 Callogobius andamanensis Menon & Chatterjee, 1974 (Andaman flap-headed goby)
 Callogobius bauchotae Goren, 1979 (Bauchot's flap-headed goby)
 Callogobius bifasciatus (J. L. B. Smith, 1958) (Double-bar flap-headed goby)
 Callogobius bothriorrhynchus (Herzenstein, 1896)
 Callogobius centrolepis M. C. W. Weber, 1909 (Centre-scale flap-headed goby)
 Callogobius clarki (Goren, 1978) 
 Callogobius clitellus McKinney & Lachner, 1978 (Saddled flap-headed goby)
 Callogobius crassus McKinney & Lachner, 1984 (Stout flap-headed goby)
 Callogobius depressus (E. P. Ramsay & J. D. Ogilby, 1886) (Flap-headed goby)
 Callogobius dori Goren, 1980
 Callogobius dorsomaculatus Akihito & Ikeda, 2021
 Callogobius flavobrunneus (J. L. B. Smith, 1958) (Slimy flap-headed goby)
 Callogobius hasseltii (Bleeker, 1851) (Hasselt's flap-headed goby)
 Callogobius hastatus McKinney & Lachner, 1978 (Spear-fin flap-headed goby)
 Callogobius illotus (Herre, 1927)
 Callogobius irrasus (J. L. B. Smith, 1959)
 Callogobius kuderi (Herre, 1943)
 Callogobius maculipinnis (Fowler, 1918) (Ostrich flap-headed goby)
 Callogobius mannarensis K. Rangarajan, 1970
 Callogobius mucosus (Günther, 1872) (Sculptured flap-headed goby)
 Callogobius nigromarginatus J. P. Chen & K. T. Shao, 2000
 Callogobius okinawae (Snyder, 1908) (Okinawa flap-headed goby)
 Callogobius pilosimentum Delventhal, Mooi, Bogorodsky & A. O. Mal, 2016 (Hairy-chinned flap-headed goby) 
 Callogobius plumatus (J. L. B. Smith, 1959) (Feather flap-headed goby)
 Callogobius producta (Herre, 1927) (Elongate flap-headed goby)
 Callogobius santa (Herre, 1935)
 Callogobius sclateri (Steindachner, 1879) (Pacific flap-headed goby)
 Callogobius seshaiyai J. Jacob & K. Rangarajan, 1960
 Callogobius sheni I. S. Chen, J. P. Chen & L. S. Fang, 2006
 Callogobius shunkan Takagi, 1957
 Callogobius snelliusi Koumans, 1953
 Callogobius snyderi (Fowler, 1946)
 Callogobius stellatus McKinney & Lachner, 1978 (Stellar flap-headed goby)
 Callogobius tanegasimae (Snyder, 1908)
 Callogobius trifasciatus Menon & Chatterjee, 1976
 Callogobius tutuilae (D. S. Jordan & Seale, 1906)
 Callogobius vanclevei (Herre, 1950)
 Callogobius winterbottomi Delventhal & Mooi, 2013 (Winterbottom's flap-headed goby)

References

Gobiidae
Marine fish genera
Taxa named by Pieter Bleeker